This is a list of demolished buildings and structures in Columbus, Ohio. Over time, countless notable buildings have been built in the city of Columbus. Some of them still stand today and can be viewed, however, many local landmarks have since been demolished. The reason for the demolition was often that the condition of the building was no longer adequate, but in some cases, its style was already ostentatious and outdated. Another aspect taken into consideration is that because the cost of renovating a building is very high, demolition is sometimes seen as preferable over renovation. However, today's opinion may not be in line with the views prevalent at the time of its demolition, and many consider it detrimental to demolish buildings that were often built with high artistic demands at the time.

In the early 20th century, Columbus was a dense city dependent on streetcars and downtown retail, with unbroken rooflines. Beginning in the mid-20th century, the city expanded substantially, and the rise of automobiles in popularity created a suburbanized city. Urban renewal became popular, and residents believed that old-looking buildings were causing a loss of business downtown, and so many buildings were demolished and replaced with parking lots. Beginning around 1999, demolitions began to be more discouraged, and city planners began to accept new urbanism and residential development in Downtown Columbus.

There may not be an accurate record of all demolished buildings, so this list is also presumably fragmentary.

Bridges

Broad Street Bridge
1937 Main Street Bridge
Town Street Bridge

Government

1840 Franklin County Courthouse
1887 Franklin County Courthouse
1872 Columbus City Hall

Hospitals and institutions

Columbus State Hospital
Hawkes Hospital
Mount Carmel West
Ohio Institute for Feeble Minded Youth
Ohio Institution for the Deaf and Dumb
St. Anthony's Hospital
St. Francis Hospital

Hotels

Chittenden Hotel
Christopher Inn
Deshler Hotel
Neil House
Park Hotel
Plaza Hotel

Prisons
Columbus City Prison
Ohio Penitentiary

Recreation and dining

Columbus Auditorium (two structures)
Franklin County Veterans Memorial
Hartman Building and Theater
Indianola Park
Kahiki Supper Club
Main Bar
Olentangy Park
RKO Grand Theatre
Santa Maria Ship & Museum
The Zoo

Sports venues

Cooper Stadium (partially demolished)
Gowdy Field
Neil Park
Ohio Field
Ohio State University Armory and Gymnasium

Recreation Park

Religion

 First Congregational Church (Capitol Square)
 First Presbyterian Church, Capitol Square
 Pontifical College Josephinum (1888-1931)
 St. Vincent's Orphan Asylum and Catholic Church
 West Side Spiritualist Church

Retail and commerce

5 and 7 South High Street
American Education Press Building
Central Market
Columbus Board of Trade Building
Columbus City Center
East End Market House
Long and Third Commercial Building
Peruna Drug Manufacturing Company Building
North Market (several locations)
Northland Mall
Ohio Building
Trautman Building

Residences

Alfred Kelley mansion
Clinton DeWeese Firestone mansion
Elijah Pierce Properties
Frederick Prentiss House
Frederick Schumacher House
Joseph F. Firestone House
Lucas Sullivant House
Maria S. Wright House
McDannald Homestead
Prentiss-Tulford House

Schools and education

Academy of St. Mary's of the Springs
Central High School (1862-1928)
Columbus Public School Library
Felton School
Franklinton Elementary School
McMillin Observatory
University Hall

Transportation
Union Station (three stations, train shed, and arcade)

See also
 Architecture of Columbus, Ohio to find lists of architects and their works
 List of destroyed heritage of the United States
 List of public art in Columbus, Ohio, including several no longer extant
 North Graveyard, no longer extant
 Columbus Landmarks, a preservation organization
 S.G. Loewendick & Sons, known for demolishing city landmarks

References

External links

 Atlas of Columbus Landmarks, via the Columbus Landmarks Foundation
 Demolished houses in Olde Towne East, compiled by the Olde Towne East Neighborhood Association

Columbus, Ohio-related lists
Lists of buildings and structures in Ohio
Lists of demolished buildings and structures